Lee Township may refer to:

Canada
 Lee Township, Ontario

Arkansas
 Lee Township, Boone County, Arkansas
 Lee Township, Cleveland County, Arkansas, in Cleveland County, Arkansas
 Lee Township, Johnson County, Arkansas, in Johnson County, Arkansas
 Lee Township, Pope County, Arkansas

California
 Lee Township, a former civil township in Sacramento County, California

Illinois
 Lee Township, Brown County, Illinois
 Lee Township, Fulton County, Illinois

Iowa
 Lee Township, Adair County, Iowa
 Lee Township, Buena Vista County, Iowa
 Lee Township, Franklin County, Iowa
 Lee Township, Madison County, Iowa
 Lee Township, Polk County, Iowa

Michigan
 Lee Township, Allegan County, Michigan
 Lee Township, Calhoun County, Michigan
 Lee Township, Midland County, Michigan

Minnesota
 Lee Township, Aitkin County, Minnesota
 Lee Township, Beltrami County, Minnesota
 Lee Township, Norman County, Minnesota

Missouri
 Lee Township, Platte County, Missouri

North Dakota
 Lee Township, Nelson County, North Dakota, in Nelson County, North Dakota

Ohio
 Lee Township, Athens County, Ohio
 Lee Township, Carroll County, Ohio
 Lee Township, Monroe County, Ohio

South Dakota
 Lee Township, Roberts County, South Dakota, in Roberts County, South Dakota

Township name disambiguation pages